Hornád (Slovak) or Hernád (Hungarian) is a river in eastern Slovakia and north-eastern Hungary.

It is a tributary to the river Slaná (Sajo). The source of the Hornád is the eastern slopes of Kráľova hoľa hill, south of Šuňava.

The river is 286 km long, with 178 km located in Slovakia, and the remaining 108 km in Hungary.

Cities along its course are Spišská Nová Ves and Košice, both in Slovakia. It flows into the river Sajó (Slovak Slaná) southeast of Miskolc.

Along the river are a series of six separate limestone rocky cliffs and steep slopes, which collectively make up the Site of Community Importance 'Hornádske vápence'.

References

Rivers of Slovakia
Rivers of Hungary
Spiš
International rivers of Europe